María Eugenia Carballedo Berlanga (born 4 September 1971) is a Spanish politician from the People's Party of the Community of Madrid (PP), serving as Cabinet Minister of the Presidency of the Community of Madrid since August 2019 and as acting Cabinet Minister of Sports and Transparency since March 2021.

References

1971 births
Living people
People's Party (Spain) politicians
People from Madrid
Members of the 11th Assembly of Madrid
Members of the 12th Assembly of Madrid